The 1991 PBA All-Filipino Conference Finals was the best-of-5 basketball championship series of the 1991 PBA All-Filipino Conference, and the conclusion of the conference's playoffs. The Purefoods Tender Juicy Hotdogs and Diet Sarsi Sizzlers played for the 49th championship contested by the league.

Purefoods Tender Juicy Hotdogs wins their first-ever All-Filipino crown and their second PBA title, in a hard-fought, thrilling series over second-year ballclub Diet Sarsi Sizzlers, 3 games to 2.

Qualification

Purefoods dropped their first two games in the semifinals, then won five of their next six outings to finish in tie with Diet Sarsi at 12–7. The Tender Juicy Hotdogs make it to the finals first by a superior quotient over the Sizzlers despite a 2–1 edge by Diet Sarsi in their three meetings with the Hotdogs in the conference.

Diet Sarsi had to win their last outing in the semifinals against Alaska to avoid a possible three-way tie at second along with San Miguel. The Sizzlers defeated the Beermen, which finish with an 11–8 card and won five games in the semifinals, in a playoff for the right to play Purefoods in the finals.

Series scoring summary

Games summary

Game 1

The Sizzlers were down by as much as 13 points in the third quarter. Purefoods coach Ely Capacio fielded in only seven players which resulted to early foul troubles of his first five. Sonny Cabatu shackled Alvin Patrimonio, limiting him to only 15 points. Diet Sarsi grabbed the lead, 105–103, on a triple by Ricric Marata. Jack Tanuan scored on a difficult baseline drive in the closing seconds and Al Solis sank two free throws to squeeze out the win.

Game 2

Diet Sarsi took the first quarter at 26–22, but the Hotdogs came through with a 20–3 blast in the second period to open a 42–29 advantage. Andy De Guzman, who's been the Sizzlers' top gunner for the second straight game, scored on a buzzer-beating triple to close the gap, 46–53 at halftime. Purefoods scored 11 straight points at the start of the third period to posted an 18-point lead, 64–46, the Sizzlers again rallied to take the upper hand, 68–67, and were up by three points entering the fourth quarter. Alvin Patrimonio, staying out of foul trouble, reasserted his might and put on a one-man show as the Hotdogs pulled away, 88–76, on a 10–0 run.

Game 3

Jack Tanuan and Al Solis once again played big in the crucial stretches, Tanuan scored with their shotclock winding down, giving the Sizzlers a 105–101 edge, from the game's last deadlock at 100-all. Al Solis drive through the hoop for a 107–103 lead for Diet Sarsi with less than a minute left.

Game 4

Purefoods raced to a 14-point lead, 80–66 in the third quarter, the Sizzlers threatened to within four points twice in the fourth period, the last at 84–88. The Hotdogs countered with eight unanswered points to put the game out of reach, 96–84.

Game 5

Diet Sarsi took control of the first two quarters, leads by as much nine at 32–23, early in the second period, the championship pressure began to hit the Sizzlers in the fourth quarter as the team missed seven of their free throws, the Hotdogs went up, 99–91, but five straight points put the Sizzlers to within 96–99, going into the last two minutes. Glenn Capacio converted on a jumper for a 101–96 count, on the next play, Jack Tanuan misses at close range in a very crucial play, with the score at 102–98 for Purefoods with 51 seconds remaining and possession for the Sizzlers, Dindo Pumaren stole the ball from Al Solis, the Hotdogs had a six-point cushion, 104–98, with 33 seconds left.

Rosters

Broadcast notes

References

External links
PBA official website

1991 PBA season
1991
Magnolia Hotshots games
Pop Cola Panthers games
PBA All-Filipino Conference Finals
PBA All-Filipino Conference Finals